The 1941 Doncaster by-election was held on 6 February 1941.  The by-election was held due to the death of the incumbent Labour MP, John Morgan.  It was won by the Labour candidate Evelyn Walkden, who was unopposed in keeping with wartime convention.

References

1941 elections in the United Kingdom
1941 in England
1940s in Yorkshire
Politics of Doncaster
By-elections to the Parliament of the United Kingdom in South Yorkshire constituencies
Unopposed by-elections to the Parliament of the United Kingdom (need citation)